Silver City Historic District may refer to:

 Silver City Historic District (Idaho), listed on the National Register of Historic Places in Idaho
 Silver City Historic District (New Mexico), listed on the National Register of Historic Places in New Mexico